James Arthur Gardiner (October 25, 1930 – April 19, 2016) was an American rower who competed in the 1956 Summer Olympics. He was born in Detroit, Michigan and died on April 19, 2016 at his home in Seattle, Washington. At the 1956 Summer Olympics in Melbourne, Australia Gardiner and his partner Pat Costello won the silver medal in the double sculls event. Gardiner also won a gold medal at the 1955 Pan American Games. He was inducted into the National Rowing Hall of Fame in 1971.

Gardiner attended Wayne State University in Detroit and was inducted into the Wayne State Athletic Hall of Fame in 1982. Gardiner rowed out of the Detroit Boat Club. In 1956 the Detroit Boat Club placed 7 oarsman on the US Olympic Rowing team, the 7 oarsman are known as the "DBC Seven."  From 1953-1959, Gardiner earned eight U.S. Rowing Championships and 15 Canadian Henley and North American Championships. In 1957 Gardiner took fourth place in the European Rowing Championships in Duisburg Germany. In 1968 Gardiner was named the manager of the U.S. Olympic Rowing Team.

References 
 
 Jim Gardiner's obituary

External links 
 National Rowing Hall of Fame
 

1930 births
2016 deaths
Rowers at the 1956 Summer Olympics
Olympic silver medalists for the United States in rowing
American male rowers
Medalists at the 1956 Summer Olympics
Pan American Games medalists in rowing
Pan American Games gold medalists for the United States
Rowers at the 1955 Pan American Games
Medalists at the 1955 Pan American Games